Eudendrium caricum is a marine species of cnidaria, a hydroid (Hydrozoa) in the family Eudendriidae. Its original description was brought up by Axel Elof Jäderholm in 1908

References

Eudendrium
Animals described in 1908